Grzegorzewice may refer to:

Grzegorzewice, Grodzisk Mazowiecki County, Poland
Grzegorzewice, Grójec County, Poland